Frédéric Pons (born in 1954) is a French Army officer and journalist.

Biography 
Pons served as a Blue Helmet in Lebanon. He rose to the rank of colonel in parachute units of the Troupes de marine, and is now a reserve officer. He teaches at the Collège interarmées de défense (CID) and at École spéciale militaire de Saint-Cyr.

He also works as a journalist at Spectacle du Monde, and as chief redactor of the World service of Valeurs Actuelles. He is president of the Association des Journalistes de la Défense (AJD), an association of journalists specialised in Defence matters.

In 1996, Pons was awarder the Erwan Bergot literary prize by the Army for Les Français à Sarajevo.

Works 
 Esthétique et politique : les intellectuels fascistes français et le cinéma : Rebatet, Brasillach, Bardèche, 1930-1945, Master thesis, Université Paris-I, 1977
 Action humanitaire et politique internationale : Politique et morale (co-authored with Alain-Gérard Slama and Jean-Marc Varaut), CASE, 1993
 Les Paras sacrifiés, Beyrouth, 1983-1984, Presses de la Cité, 1994
 Les Français à Sarajevo : les bataillons piégés, 1992 - 1995, Presses de la Cité, 1996, Prix littéraire de l'armée de terre - Erwan Bergot en 1996
 Les Troupeaux du diable, Presses de la Cité, 1999
 Les Casques bleus français : 50 ans au service de la paix dans le monde, Italiques, 2002
 Les Soleils de l'Adour, Presses de la Cité, 2003
 Pièges à Bagdad, Presses de la Cité, 2004
 Passeurs de nuit, Presses de la Cité, 2006
 Israël en état de choc, Presses de la Cité, 2007
 La République des militaires (avec Jean-Dominique Merchet), Jacob-Duvernet, 2007
 Mourir pour le Liban, Presses de la Cité, 2007
 Paras de choc au combat, Presses de la Cité, 2009
 Opérations extérieures, Presses de la Cité, 2009

External links 
 Site de l'AJD
 Articles (Valeurs actuelles)

French journalists
Living people
1954 births
French male non-fiction writers